This is a list of Ministers of Finance of France, including the equivalent positions of Superintendent of Finances and Controller-General of Finances during the Ancien Régime. The position of Superintendent of Finances was abolished following the arrest of Nicolas Fouquet; his powers were transferred to First Minister Jean-Baptiste Colbert, who would become ex officio Controller-General of Finances four years later after the elevation of the office.

Superintendents of Finances, 1518–1661

Controller-General of Finances, 1661–1791

Ministers of Finance, 1791–1944

Free French Commissioners of Finance, 1941–1944

Ministers of Finance, 1944–present

See also 
 Government of France
 List of Budget Ministers of France

Finance
Finance Ministers